Amanat Baghdad Sport Club is a football team based in Karkh District, Baghdad, Iraq, that competes in the Iraq Division One, the second tier of Iraqi football. Formed in 1957 as Amanat Al-Asima, the team merged with Al-Baladiyat SC in 1977, who had finished as runners-up of the 1975–76 Iraq FA Cup.

History
On 1 July 1957, Amanat Al-Asima were formed to represent the Municipality of Baghdad. Amanat Al-Asima won the Iraq Central FA League title in the 1958–59 season and won the Police Director General Cup twice in 1959 and 1960.

In 1977, Amanat Al-Asima merged with Al-Baladiyat SC to form Al-Amana SC. On 5 August 2009, Al-Amana SC was renamed to Baghdad SC. In 2014, Baghdad SC renamed to Amanat Baghdad SC.

Merged teams

Al-Baladiyat
Al-Baladiyat SC was a club formed in 1974 by the merger of Isalat Al-Mai and Maslahat Naqil Al-Rukab. Al-Baladiyat finished as runners-up of the Iraq FA Cup in the 1975–76 season.

Isalat Al-Mai
Isalat Al-Mai was a team formed in 1954. Isalat Al-Mai won the Iraq Central FA Second Division in the 1959–60 season.

Maslahat Naqil Al-Rukab

Maslahat Naqil Al-Rukab was a team formed in 1956. Maslahat Naqil Al-Rukab won the Iraq Central FA League four times in 1956–57, 1960–61, 1964–65 and 1970–71, and finished as runners-up in 1967–68. They also won the Iraq Central FA Perseverance Cup in 1965.

Stadium
Since 2011, Amanat Baghdad have got their own stadium. The Amanat Baghdad Stadium holds 5,000 people.

Current squad

First-team squad

Technical staff
{| class="toccolours"
!bgcolor=silver|Position
!bgcolor=silver|Name
!bgcolor=silver|Nationality
|- bgcolor=#eeeeee
|Manager:||Wissam Talib||
|- 
|Assistant manager:||Vacant||
|- bgcolor=#eeeeee
|Fitness coach:||Raad Salman||
|- 
| Goalkeeping coach:||Haitham Khalil||
|-bgcolor=#eeeeee
|Team supervisor:||Ahmed Ezzat||
|-

Managerial history
  Ahmed Khalef 
  Thair Ahmed 
  Essam Hamad 
  Jamal Ali 
  Wissam Talib

Honours

Major
National
Iraq Division One (second tier)
Winners (2): 1990–91, 2004–05 (shared)
Regional
Iraq Central FA League
Winners (1): 1958–59

Minor
Police Director General Cup
Winners (2): 1959, 1960

Individual honours
2009 FIFA Confederations Cup
The following players have played in the FIFA Confederations Cup whilst playing for Al-Amana:
 2009 – Essam Yassin

References

External links
 Amanat Baghdad Official website
 Club page on Kooora
 Amanat Baghdad Facebook

Sport in Baghdad
1957 establishments in Iraq
Football clubs in Baghdad